Stefan Hula Sr. (born 12 September 1947 in Szczyrk) is a Polish nordic combined skier who competed in the early 1970s. He won a bronze medal in the individual event at the 1974 FIS Nordic World Ski Championships in Falun.

His son Stefan Jr. is a successful ski jumper.

References

External links

1947 births
Living people
Polish male Nordic combined skiers
Olympic Nordic combined skiers of Poland
Nordic combined skiers at the 1972 Winter Olympics
Nordic combined skiers at the 1976 Winter Olympics
FIS Nordic World Ski Championships medalists in Nordic combined
People from Bielsko County
Sportspeople from Silesian Voivodeship
20th-century Polish people